Annelies Burmeister (25 November 1928 in Ludwigslust – 16 June 1988 in Berlin) was a German contralto and actress.

Burmeister studied at the Hochschule für Musik in Weimar. She was a member of the Deutsche Oper in Berlin and made several guest appearances with other ensembles, including the Hamburg State Opera and the Opéra de Paris. She performed at the Bayreuth Festival in 1966 and 1967, where her roles included Fricka and Siegrune in Der Ring des Nibelungen, which has been released on Compact Discs.  Also in her discography is her interpretation of Mary in Der fliegende Holländer, with Theo Adam and Anja Silja, conducted by Otto Klemperer for EMI, in 1968.
Brahms Alto Rhapsody and Lieder for VEB ETERNA, in 1968 and 1971, with Leipzig Rundfunkchor under Horst Neumann, reissued on CD 0031402BC Berlin Classics in 1996.

References

1928 births
1988 deaths
People from Ludwigslust
German operatic contraltos
20th-century German women opera singers
Hochschule für Musik Franz Liszt, Weimar alumni